Nicholas Grainger (born 3 October 1994) is an English freestyle swimmer representing Great Britain at the FINA World Aquatics Championships. He has won two gold medals as part of a relay team at the World Championships.

Early life
Grainger was born on 3 October 1994 in Rotherham, England. He studied at Sheffield Hallam University.

Career
Grainger competed for City of Sheffield before being selected for the national team. He first competed in an international in the 2014 Commonwealth Games held in Glasgow, but only finished eighth in the 200m freestyle due to a back injury that affected his training before the games.

In 2015, Grainger qualified for the World Championships after finishing second in the final of the 400m freestyle at the British Swimming Championships.  At the 2015 World Aquatics Championships, he failed to qualified for the 400m freestyle final, but he was part of team that won gold in the Men's 4 × 200m freestyle relay.  He swam in the heats but not in the final.

At the 2017 World Aquatics Championships, Grainger won gold in the 4x200m freestyle with James Guy, Stephen Milne and Duncan Scott.

At the 2018 Commonwealth Games held in the Gold Coast, Australia, Grainger was part of the team that won silver in the 4x200 m freestyle.

References

External links
 Nicholas  Grainger at Swimswam

 Nicholas  Grainger at FINA

British male swimmers
British male freestyle swimmers
Sportspeople from Rotherham
World Aquatics Championships medalists in swimming
1994 births
Living people
Commonwealth Games medallists in swimming
Commonwealth Games silver medallists for England
Swimmers at the 2018 Commonwealth Games
Medallists at the 2018 Commonwealth Games